Edwin C. Brock (20 April 1946 - 22 September 2015) was an American Egyptologist, who worked for the Theban Mapping Project at the American University in Cairo. He worked on royal sarcophagi in the Valley of the Kings. He also worked in the tombs of Merenptah (KV8) and Amenmeses (KV10), along with Otto Schaden and the Theban Mapping Project (of which he was a member from 1997 to 2004).  He was the co-director of the Amenmesse Tomb Project, which in February 2006 announced the discovery of KV63.  He also supervised archaeological salvage work in Luxor as part of the wastewater project there.

He was married to Canadian Egyptologist Lyla Pinch Brock. He died 22 September 2015 in Cairo.

Edwin Brock was the author of The Temples of Abu Simbel: An Illustrated Guide. The Houses of Ramesses & Nefertary. , The Palm Press, 2006.

References

External links
KV10:The Amenmesse Project

American Egyptologists
2015 deaths
American expatriates in Egypt
1946 births
The American University in Cairo